Bauzy is a commune in the Loir-et-Cher department in the Centre region of central France.

The inhabitants of the commune are known as Bauziens or Bauziennes.

Geography
Bauzy is located in the heart of Sologne some 20 km south-east of Blois, 40 km south-west of Orléans, and 40 km north-east of Vierzon. Access to the commune is by the D60 road from Bracieux in the north-west which passes through the heart of the commune and the village and continues south-east to Vernou-en-Sologne. Apart from the village there is the hamlet of La Boulaie in the south-east. The commune is mixed forest and farmland.

The commune is dotted with many small lakes including the Étang d'Avaray, the Étang de l'Oie, and the Étang Saulier plus numerous others. The Beuvron river flows through the north-east of the commune from south-east to north-west and continues to join the Loire at Candé-sur-Beuvron. The Bonne Heure stream flows through the middle of the commune and the village from south-east to north-west where it joins the Beuvron at Bracieux. Many small tributaries feed the Bonne Heure from the numerous lakes.

Toponymy
Bauzy comes from the Low Latin Balaesiacus and Balaesius and its variant Valesisus and the possessive suffix -acus giving "Domain of Balaesiacus.

Bauzy was mentioned as:Bauzi in January 1365; Bauzy and Bauzi in February 1365 and January 1365; Bauzy in February 1365; and Bauzy en Sologne on 24 July 1376.

The Parish was split up for the creation of the Parish of Fontaines-en-Sologne.

Bauzy appears as Bauzy'' on the 1750 Cassini Map and the same on the 1790 version.

Administration

List of Successive Mayors

Population
In 2017 the commune had 278 inhabitants.

Distribution of age groups
The age distribution of the population of the town is similar to that of the department.

Percentage Distribution of Age Groups in Bauzy and Loir-et-Cher Department in 2017

Source: INSEE

Culture and heritage

Civil heritage
The Boudeux Fountain just outside the village on the left towards Neuvy.

The commune has a number of buildings and sites that are registered as historical monuments:
A Farmhouse at Villevaudran (19th century)
A Chateau at Veillenne (1846)
A Farmhouse at Rivaude (16th century)
A Farmhouse at La Boulaie (16th century)
A Unidentified Edifice (High Middle Ages)
A House (1863)
Farmhouses (16th-19th century)
Houses (16th-20th century)

Religious heritage
The commune has several religious buildings and sites that are registered as historical monuments:

A Wayside Cross at La Rivière (1891)
A Monumental Cross (19th century)
The Parish Church of Saint Baumer (12th century) The church contains a large number of items that are registered as historical objects.

Personalities

 Gérard Lemaignen (Margency, 11 September 1924 - 22 December 2004), President of the joint committee for country chateaux, President of the Community of communes of Pays de Chambord, Mayor of Bauzy from 1952 to 2004
 Louis Lemaignen (Blois, 4 July 1856 - Blois, 27 December 1951), grandfather of Gérard, Mayor of Bauzy for 39 years.

See also
Communes of the Loir-et-Cher department

References

Communes of Loir-et-Cher